Danger on Dartmoor is a 1980 British children's drama film directed by David Eady and starring Marcus Evans, Simon Henderson, Debby Salter, Barry Foster and Patricia Hayes.

Plot
Children lost in a fog on Dartmoor face dangers including a savage dog and an escaped prisoner.

Cast
Marcus Evans as Robin Chudleigh
Simon Henderson as Jonathan Chudleigh
Debby Salter as Louise
Barry Foster as Green
Patricia Hayes as Mrs. Green
Sam Kydd		
Michael Ripper		
Michael Goldie		
David Jackson		
Jonathan Newth		
Mitzi Rogers

References

External links

1980 films
1980 drama films
Films directed by David Eady
British drama films
Children's Film Foundation
1980s English-language films
1980s British films